2010 Regional League Division 2 North-East Region is the 2nd season of the League competition since its establishment in 2009. It is in the third tier of the Thai football league system.

The league has been expanded from 12 clubs in 2009 to 16 clubs this season. The league winners and runners up will qualify for the 2010 Regional League Division 2 championship stage.

Changes from Last Season

Team Changes

Renamed Clubs

Mukdahan-Savannakhet renamed Mukdahan

Expansion Clubs

Ubon Tiger, Nong Khai, Yasothon United, Nong Bua Lamphu and Kalasin joined the newly expanded league setup.

Serving Bans

Ubon United are in the first year of their two-year ban.

Stadium and locations

Standings Table

Results

References

External links
  Football Association of Thailand

Regional League North-East Division seasons
North